The Commerce Department Karachi University operates under the Faculty of Management & Administrative Sciences of University of Karachi
It was established in the year 1974.

Faculty

Assistant Professors

Ms. Zaeema Asrar Mohiuddin

Dr. Sadaf Mustafa

Lecturers

Mr. Hasan Raza

Ms. Ifrah Saher

Mr. Arfeen A.Siddiqui

Ms.Ayesha Fareed

Mr. Muhammad Farrukh Aslam

Ms. Rukshinda Begum

Ms. Syeda Kanza Nisar

Visiting Faculty

Prof. Dr. Dilshad Zafar

Mr. Shahabuddin Lakhani

Mr. Abu Ahmed

Mr. Uzair Mirza

Mr. Mushtaq Madras Wala

Programs

Graduate (Morning/Evening) 
 BS - 4 year (Morning/Evening)
 M.COM - 2 year (Business Studies Graduates)

Incidents 

On, April 26, 2022, four people including three Chinese nationals, were killed and four others were injured in a suicide attack outside the Confucius Institute which is located on 3rd floor of faculty of Commerce department inside Karachi University.

See Also
University of Karachi
Karachi University Business School

References

University of Karachi
Karachi